Alberni-Nanaimo was a provincial electoral district in the Canadian province of British Columbia which was used only in the general elections of 1933 and 1937.

For other current and historical ridings on Vancouver Island, please see Vancouver Island (electoral districts)..

Electoral history 
Note:  Winners of each election are in bold.

|Independent
|Roy Branwood Dier
|align="right"|162 	 	 	 		 	 		
|align="right"|2.44%
|align="right"|
|align="right"|unknown

 
|Co-operative Commonwealth Fed.
|James Lyle Telford
|align="right"|2,353 		 	
|align="right"|35.51%
|align="right"|
|align="right"|unknown
|- bgcolor="white"
!align="right" colspan=3|Total valid votes
!align="right"|6,627 	
!align="right"|100.00%
!align="right"|
|- bgcolor="white"
!align="right" colspan=3|Total rejected ballots
!align="right"|76
!align="right"|
!align="right"|
|- bgcolor="white"
!align="right" colspan=3|Turnout
!align="right"|%
!align="right"|
!align="right"|
|}

 
|Co-operative Commonwealth Fed.
|Alexander Maitland Stephen 1
|align="right"|3,129 			 	
|align="right"|38.36%
|align="right"|
|align="right"|unknown

|- bgcolor="white"
!align="right" colspan=3|Total valid votes
!align="right"|8,156 		
!align="right"|100.00%
!align="right"|
|- bgcolor="white"
!align="right" colspan=3|Total rejected ballots
!align="right"|100
!align="right"|
!align="right"|
|- bgcolor="white"
!align="right" colspan=3|Turnout
!align="right"|%
!align="right"|
!align="right"|
|- bgcolor="white"
!align="right" colspan=7|1  Although suspended and repudiated by the provincial executive, Stephen was nominated by the Alberni-Nanaimo CCF Club, and ran as a CCF candidate.
|}

The riding was redistributed after the 1937 election.  In the 1941 general election the successor ridings to Alberni-Nanaimo were:

Alberni
Nanaimo and the Islands

See also
Politics of Canada

References

External links 
 Elections BC Historical Returns

Former provincial electoral districts of British Columbia on Vancouver Island